The William Montgomery House is a historic mansion on South Queen Street in Lancaster, Pennsylvania, United States.  Built in 1803, it was listed on the National Register of Historic Places on May 18, 2000. It has been recognized as one of the best Federal-style buildings in Lancaster.

History 

The William Montgomery House was designed by the architect Stephen Hills, who also designed the first Pennsylvania State Capitol building, in 1803. The house was owned William Montgomery, a prominent, local attorney. The house was bought in 1960 by the next-door Watt & Shand department store, but was vacated after the store closed in 1995.

When the Lancaster County Convention Center was constructed in the late 2000s, the house was preserved externally and is a feature in the attached Lancaster Marriott's main lobby.  In 2012 a project began to renovate the interior as high-end meeting spaces.  The newly branded Montgomery Mansion is slated to open in November 2013.

See also 
 National Register of Historic Places listings in Lancaster, Pennsylvania

References 

Houses on the National Register of Historic Places in Pennsylvania
Houses in Lancaster, Pennsylvania
Federal architecture in Pennsylvania
Houses completed in 1803
National Register of Historic Places in Lancaster, Pennsylvania